Belliidae is a family of crabs of the order Decapoda.

They respond to predators by hyper-extending all of its limbs and remain in this position for varied amounts of time (Hazlett).

Species
Seven species belong to the family Belliidae :
Acanthocyclus albatrossis Rathbun, 1898
Acanthocyclus gayi Lucas, 1844
Acanthocyclus hassleri Rathbun, 1898
Bellia picta H. Milne-Edwards, 1848
Corystoides abbreviatus A. Milne-Edwards, 1880
Corystoides chilensis Lucas, 1844
Heterozius rotundifrons A. Milne-Edwards, 1867

References

Crabs
Decapod families

 
Hazlett, B. A., & Mclay, C. L. (2005). Anti-predator responses of the intertidal crab Heterozius rotundifrons (Brachyura: Belliidae) in air and water. Marine & Freshwater Behaviour & Physiology, 38(2), 95–103.  doi:10.1080/10236240500078339.